The 1963 Tipperary Senior Hurling Championship was the 73rd staging of the Tipperary Senior Hurling Championship since its establishment by the Tipperary County Board in 1887.

Thurles Sarsfields were the defending champions.

On 27 October 1963, Thurles Sarsfields won the championship after a 4-10 to 2-10 defeat of Roscrea in the final at Thurles Sportsfield. It was their 25th championship title overall and their third title in succession.

Results

Final

References

Tipperary
Tipperary Senior Hurling Championship